The Exemplars is a fictional group appearing in American comic books published by Marvel Comics. It was made up of eight humans - Bedlam, Carnivore, Conquest, Decay, Inferno, Juggernaut, Stonecutter, and Tempest - who were empowered by the Octessence.

Fictional team history
Eight powerful magical beings known as the Octessence could not agree who amongst them was the most powerful. They decided on a wager wherein each of the eight beings created an artifact which would turn the first human being that touched it into an Exemplar, personifying the power of that specific magical being. When all eight Exemplars were formed, they would have a Ceremony of the Octessence, where the Exemplars could battle and determine who was the most powerful.

The first Exemplar was the Juggernaut, who had formerly been Cain Marko, stepbrother to Charles Xavier. Marko found the Crimson Ruby of Cytorrak while serving in the Korean War. Unfortunately for the Juggernaut, the Temple of Cytorrak collapsed while he was inside, and it took the Juggernaut many years to dig out.

Seven other humans were transformed into Exemplars: Olisa Kabaki, Count Andreas Zorba, Brigdet Malone, Yoshiro Hachiman, Sam McGee, Utama Somchart and Nicolette Giroux. Despite all eight Exemplars coming from drastically different backgrounds, all shared the key detail that they were primarily motivated by their frustration and rage at having failed to get what they wanted out of life. Although each Exemplar committed villainous acts on their own, the first action the Exemplars took as a team was to attack Spider-Man in the basement of the Daily Bugle. As a team, they also fought against Iron Man, Thor and Professor X when they attempted to recruit the Juggernaut in the construction of the 'God Machine', which they would use to take over the world. With the aid of the four gathered heroes, Iron Man and Thor held off the rest of the Exemplars, while Spider-Man tricked them into destroying a vital component of the machine. Xavier then used his powers to draw out the true Juggernaut. Once free, Juggernaut was able to destroy the machine, causing an explosion that sent the Exemplars flying all around the world while the heroes only just managed to escape.

Although the Juggernaut resisted Cytorrak's evil influence (Iron Man speculated that the process that gave him his powers had been interrupted) and eventually switched to the side of good, the other Exemplars did not, each of them determined to continue their respective entity's vendetta against the others. Having come together after the explosion, they tracked Juggernaut to New York, declared him a traitor and captured him, planning on executing him for his crimes against the Octessense. At the last moment, Juggernaut was rescued by the combined force of the Avengers, the team consisting of Captain America, Iron Man, Thor, Wonder Man, the Scarlet Witch, Firestar, Justice, the Wasp, and Giant-Man, while being aided by Quicksilver, Hercules, Spider-Man, and Nova. The Exemplars managed to defeat all of the heroes except for Captain America, who made Bedlam realize that she and the other Exemplars had had significant psychological alterations made by the entities that gave them their powers. Bedlam used her psychic powers to broadcast her realization to the other Exemplars, clearing their minds of the evil mystical influence, leaving their original personalities but retaining their powers. After that, they departed until they could figure out what to do next, and haven't been seen since.

The Artifacts
As per the wager of the Octessence, each created a relic possessing a fraction of their power causing the first mortal to touch the relics to become living embodiments of said power. The eight artifacts were:

The Blinding Brazier of Balthakk
The Crimson Gem of Cyttorak
The Fearsome Fist of Farallah
The Ivory Idol of Ikonn
The Kestrel Key of Krakkan
The Ringed Ruby of Raggadorr
The Verdant Vial of Valtorr
The Wondrous Waterfall of Watoomb

Membership

Bedlam 
Bedlam (Olisa Kabaki). An 8-year-old girl from Kenya. She was eager to learn as a child, but was hampered by drugs she had to take for a mental disorder. Empowered by the Ivory Idol of Ikonn, she possessed powerful telepathic and mind control abilities, including the ability to fire off mental bolts of pure madness, which had a debilitating effect. She could only communicate via her telepathic abilities, which always caused pain in the recipient. She also possessed some telekinetic abilities such as levitation.

Carnivore 
Carnivore (Andreas Zorba): A Greek Count and an independent collector of antiquities, while simultaneously lacking a real interest in maintaining his collection. Empowered by the Fearsome Fist of Farallah, he possessed superhuman physical abilities, coordination, fighting ability and claws, as well as a pronounced animal nature and animalistic senses. He was killed by Black Knight.

Conquest 
Conquest (Bridget Malone): A woman from Belfast, Northern Ireland. She lost many of her family members in the Troubles and is a possible victim of rape. She has suspected links to the IRA. She went on the run when she was suspected of involvement in a shootout with police. She was empowered by the Kestrel Key of Krakkan. She possessed enhanced fighting skills and a wide assortment of weaponry attached to her costume, also demonstrating an enhanced physique. Her reflexes were fast enough to allow her to catch Quicksilver while he was in motion. She could also fire powerful bolts of energy from the kestrel key.

Decay 
Decay (Yoshiro Hachiman): A Japanese business efficiency expert, generally disliked for constantly firing people. He is known to have a fondness for artwork. Empowered by the Verdant Vial of Valtorr, he possessed a "touch of death" that caused both organic and inorganic objects to disintegrate (Although Thor and Hercules were immune to his powers due to their immortality). He also seemed to have some ability to levitate as well as a form of enhanced durability, likely due to his corpselike state.

Inferno 
Inferno (Samantha McGee): An American pilot from Tennessee. She used to be employed by the United States Air Force, but resented the lack of freedom she felt when under the control of her employers. She resigned, moved to Nunavut, Canada, and set up her own company, McGee Charter Service. She was self-employed but the business was not lucrative. Empowered by the Blinding Brazier of Balthakk, she possessed the ability to fly and generate intense heat and flames, generally focused into powerful bolts of energy, strong enough to vaporize steel.

Juggernaut 
Juggernaut (Cain Marko): Stepbrother of Professor X and long-time foe of the X-Men. Empowered by the Crimson Crystal of Cyttorak, he possessed superhuman strength and invulnerability, becoming unstoppable once in motion.

Stonecutter 
Stonecutter (Utama Somchart): An itinerant worker from Thailand. He was a dreamer and graffiti artist who lacked professional skills and the talent to be the artist he wanted to become. He was empowered by the Ringed Ruby of Raggadorr, possessing enhanced strength and combat skills, as well as the ability to design and build the "God Machine" which would drain humanity of its free will. He could also develop a machine that would have drained the Juggernaut's powers (Although he noted that it would take too long to build it before the Juggernaut escaped his current captivity). He possessed the ability to design and create machines rapidly, such as energy cannons, energy restraints and the flying fortress.

Tempest 
Tempest (Nicolette Giroux): A French woman and an international game warden that was known to take her job too far. Empowered by the Wondrous Waterfall of Watoomb, she possessed the ability to manipulate nature, and demonstrated the ability to create and control plant life, manipulate the earth, and manipulate the weather, however, her most used ability was control over the winds, summoning powerful storms and becoming an insubstantial fog-like form.

References
Black Knight (Marvel Comics)

External links

History of the Exemplars

 

Characters created by Howard Mackie
Marvel Comics supervillain teams